Raffles, the Gentleman Thug is a comic strip featured in the British publication Viz, the central character of which is a 19th-century nobleman given to 'immense erudition and wanton violence'. Raffles inhabits the formal world of the Victorian/Edwardian gentleman, but behaves as a 21st-century hooligan, though he always maintains his elegant style. The comic strip parodies British yob culture, placing Raffles in anachronistic modern situations which he usually employs extreme violence to resolve.

Raffles is always accompanied by his loyal friend Bunny (Lord Bunniford) and has other acquaintances such as 'Dave, 6th Earl of Bermondsey' (a notorious section of South East London) and Clarence, 3rd Earl of Burberry (a reference to Burberry, stereotypically the fashion brand of choice for Britain's 'chavs').

Raffles' character is a parody of E. W. Hornung's Raffles the Thief.

Language

The Raffles strip is noted for its substitution of formal language in common slang phrases. For example:

'Kick the little bastard' becomes 'Lapidate the little illegitimate'
'Tits oot for the lads' (tag line of fellow Viz character Sid the Sexist) becomes 'Kindly remove thy decollétage from its corsetry for the delectation of the gentlemen here assembled'
'Fanny magnet' (when describing his new car) becomes 'Vaginal lodestone'
'You big girl's blouse' becomes 'You sizable ladies chemise'
'Rat's cocks' (a frequent vulgarism used by Viz writers) becomes 'Rodents' penii'
'There's plenty more where that came from' becomes 'There's an elegant plenitude from whenceforth that originated'
'Run like fuck, it's the filth!' becomes 'Run like coitus, it's the putrescence!'
'Fuck my luck' (another frequent vulgarism used by Viz writers) becomes 'Fornicate my fortune'
'Stitch that' becomes 'Embroider that'
'Eat my dust' becomes 'Consume my pulverulence'
'You cheeky cunt' becomes 'You insolent vagina'
'Wanker!" becomes 'Onanist!"

Historical references

Raffles found himself in many situations featuring famous characters and events from the 19th century and early 20th century:

 Playing cricket against the world-famous W. G. Grace, cheating him and then beating him up in the toilets.
 Knocking out the Elephant Man, Joseph Merrick during a visit to a fairground freak show after accusing him of "looking at his bird".
 Fighting in World War I, bullying war poet Rupert Brooke and acting like a football hooligan during the 1914 Christmas Truce.
 Getting drunk at an 'At Home' and trying to pick a fight with Oscar Wilde, who at the end smashes his face in. Raffles is helped away by Bunny, and manages to say, "I wish I'd said that, Bunny" to which his friend replies, "You will, Raffles; you will"; a misquote of Wilde's wit.

Viz characters